Saint Beuve may refer to:
Saint Bobo
Beuve, Abbess of Saint Pierre de Reims

See also
Charles Augustin Sainte-Beuve (1804–1869)